Ryszard Iwon Terlecki (born 2 September 1949) is a Polish politician, the Parliamentary Caucus Head of the Law and Justice party. Terlecki, a historian and professor of humanities, lectures at the Pontifical University of John Paul II. He is a member of the Sejm, serving since 2007.

In September 2021 Terlecki said that the PIS party wants to remain in the EU and have a cooperative relationship, but that the EU 'should be acceptable to us.'with him furthering said 'If things go the way they are likely to go, we will have to search for drastic solutions,' he warned. 'The British showed that the dictatorship of the Brussels bureaucracy did not suit them and turned around and left,'. This led to some people saying Terlecki called for a Polexit.

Personal life
He is the son of writer and journalist Olgierd Terlecki who was a secret collaborator of the Security Service in PRL for 35 years, and his wife Janina. In his youth, he was a participant in the hippie movement and one of the precursors of this youth subculture in Poland. He was known in the environment under the pseudonym Pies (pol. Dog). Then he took part in opposition movements  - as a co-worker of Workers' Defence Committee, member of "Solidarity" independent trade union, and journalist in underground press. He was married twice, and has three children from his first marriage.

References

1949 births
Living people
Politicians from Kraków
Law and Justice politicians
Deputy Marshals of the Sejm of the Third Polish Republic
Members of the Polish Sejm 2007–2011
Members of the Polish Sejm 2011–2015
Members of the Polish Sejm 2015–2019
Members of the Polish Sejm 2019–2023
People associated with the Institute of National Remembrance
Jagiellonian University alumni
20th-century Polish historians
Polish male non-fiction writers